Narippatta  is a village in Kozhikode district in the state of Kerala, India.

Demographics
 India census, Narippatta had a population of 21,304 with 10,293 males and 11,011 females.

Transportation
Naripatta village connects to other parts of India through Vatakara town on the west and Kuttiady town on the east.  National highway No.66 passes through Vatakara and the northern stretch connects to Mangalore, Goa and Mumbai.  The southern stretch connects to Cochin and Trivandrum.  The eastern National Highway No.54 going through Kuttiady connects to Mananthavady, Mysore and Bangalore. The nearest airports are at Kannur and Kozhikode.  The nearest railway station is at Vatakara.

See also
List of towns in India by population

References

Villages in Kozhikode district
Kuttiady area